The Grand Orient of the Netherlands or Grand East of the Netherlands (Dutch: Orde van Vrijmetselaren onder het Grootoosten der Nederlanden) is a Masonic Grand Lodge in the Netherlands.  It falls within the mainstream Anglo-American tradition of Freemasonry, being recognized by The United Grand Lodge of England and the 51 Grand Lodges in the United States.  In addition to its jurisdiction over nine districts in the Netherlands, it also administers three Lodges in Suriname through the Provincial Grand Lodge of Suriname, three lodges in Curaçao, one in South Africa, one in Thailand, and through the Provincial Grand Lodge of the Caribbean, three lodges in Aruba and one in St. Maarten.  In the Netherlands it claims to have 145 lodges with 5,792 members.

It also runs the Prince Frederick Museum and has an online catalogue available for its library.

It was founded in either 1756 or 1757.

Historic Grand Lodges under the Grand Orient

The Grand Orient of the Netherlands used to have provincial Grand Lodges under its jurisdiction, including the Grand Lodge of South Africa and the Grand Lodge of the Transvaal.  One of the Lodges that was subservient to the Grand Lodge hosted the early legislative assemblies of the Cape Colony.

Active freemasonry existed throughout the Dutch East Indies (now: Indonesia). In 1922 a Dutch Provincial Grand Lodge, under the Grand Orient of the Netherlands, at Weltevreden (Batavia) controlled twenty Lodges in the colony: fourteen in Java, three in Sumatra and others in Makassar and Salatiga.

Administers the Provincial Grand Lodge of Zimbabwe which has 5 lodges under its jurisdiction, 3 in Harare and one each in Marondera and Bulawayo.  The Grand Lodge was formed in 1963 and the first lodge, Zambesia  in Bulawayo in 1896.

Grand Masters
 1735 - 1748 : Johan Cornelis Radermacher
 1749 - 1752 : Kolonel Joost Gerrit van Wassenaer (1716-1753)
 1752 - 1756 : Louis Dagran (interim)
 1756 - 1758 : Albrecht Nicolaas van Aerssen Beijeren
 1758 - 1759 : Carel van Bentinck
 1759 - 1798 : Carel van Boetzelaer
 1798 - 1804 : Isaak van Teylingen
 1804 - 1810 : Cornelis Gerrit Bijleveld
 1810 - 1812 : Isaac Bousquet
 1812 - 1816 : Willem Philip Barnaart
 1816 - 1816 : Tussenbestuur van negen
 1816 - 1881 : Prince Frederick of the Netherlands 
 1882 - 1884 : Alexander, Prince of Orange
 1885 - 1892 : Pieter Johannes Gesinus van Diggelen
 1892 - 1906 : Gerrit Van Visser
 1906 - 1917 : Simon Marius Hugo van Gijn
 1917 - 1923 : Meinhard Steven Lingbeek
 1923 - 1927 : Willem Sonneveld
 1926 - 1929 : Johannes Hendrik Carpentier-Alting
 1929 - 1941 : Hermannus van Tongeren
 1945 - 1952 : L.J.J. Caron
 1952 - 1961 : C.M.R. Davidson
 1961 - 1962 : M. ten Cate
 1962 - 1974 : J. Kok
 1974 - 1979 : G. van Wezel
 1979 - 1982 : Th. Boesman
 1982 - 1986 : W. Sepp
 1986 - 1990 : J.M. Barents
 1990 - 1997 : R. Schultink
 1997 - 2000 : B. Sarphati
 2000 - 2003 : P.G. Roodhuyzen
 2003 - 2010 : J.D. van Rossum
 2010 - 2016 : W.S. Meijer
 2016 - present : G. van Eijk

References

External links
 G.O.N.

Netherlands, Grand Orient of the
Freemasonry in the Netherlands